Uri Singer, is a businessman and film producer. He is the owner and CEO of Passage Pictures, under which he has produced multiple award-winning films.

Singer has been carving out a niche in the industry by acquiring and adapting literary classics for the screen. His current project, White Noise, based on the Don DeLillo's best-selling novel, is filming in Ohio, with Noah Baumbach directing. The film stars Adam Driver, Greta Gerwig, and Don Cheadle. 

In 2020, Singer acquired the rights to DeLillo's Underworld. In September 2021, it was announced that Theodore Melfi would write and direct the film for Netflix.

Also in September 2021, Singer obtained the rights to Vladimir Nabokov’s Invitation to a Beheading, adding to a list of other classics he has in development, including Kurt Vonnegut’s Hocus Pocus and The Silence by Don DeLillo. 

Singer and Passage Pictures believe in producing quality content for film and television that transcend genres and demographics. Past projects include Marjorie Prime, starring Jon Hamm, Geena Davis, Tim Robbins and Lois Smith. The film, based on a play by the 2015 Pulitzer finalist Jordan Harrison, was written by Michael Almereyda and premiered at Sundance in 2017. It went on to win the Alfred Sloan Foundation Feature Film Prize.

He also produced Experimenter (written and directed by Michael Almereyda) starring Peter Sarsgaard and Winona Ryder, as well as TESLA, starring Ethan Hawke and Kyle MacLachlan, which premiered at Sundance in 2020. The film won the Alfred Sloan Foundation Feature Film Prize.

Future projects include: I am Rose Fatou (written by Ted Melfi) and The King of Oil, based on the international bestseller The King of Oil: The Secret Lives of Marc Rich by Daniel Ammann. The script was penned by Joe Shrapnel and Anna Waterhouse and is set at Universal Pictures with John Krasinski’s Sunday Night Productions co-producing and Matt Damon attached to play the lead. 

Singer is a member of the Producers Guild of America (PGA).

Filmography

TV

References

External links 

Living people
American film producers
Year of birth missing (living people)